Niamh Kindlon (born 22 July 1981) is an Irish sportswoman. She played ladies' Gaelic football with her local club, Magheracloone Mitchell's, and with Monaghan.

Sporting career
Kindlon won an All-Ireland with Monaghan in 1997. She won All-Stars in 1998, 2002 and 2008, and retired in 2015. She was the subject of an episode of Laochra Gael on 24 February 2015; a special preview took place in Carrickmacross.

References

External links

1981 births
Living people
Monaghan ladies' Gaelic footballers